Tellurium iodide is an inorganic compound with the formula TeI. Two forms are known. Their structures differ from the other monohalides of tellurium.  There are three subiodides of tellurium, α-TeI, β-TeI, and Te2I, and one tellurium tetraiodide.

Preparation and properties
TeI is a gray solid formed by the hydrothermal reaction of tellurium metal and iodine in hydroiodic acid.  When this reaction is conducted near 270 °C gives the α-TeI, which is triclinic.  When the same mixture is heated to 150 °C, one obtains the metastable monoclinic phase β-TeI.  The compounds are related structurally to Te2I (see ditellurium bromide), but the additional iodide groups do not bridge to other Te centers.

The corresponding monochloride and monobromide are molecular compounds with the formula Te2X2.

Tellurium diiodide
Although TeI2 has not been isolated in bulk, complexes of the type TeI2(thiourea)2 are well characterized. These complexes precipitate upon treatment of aqueous solutions of the related tellurium dibromide complex with sodium iodide.

References

Iodides
Tellurium halides
Tellurium compounds
Chalcohalides